Jean-Claude Michel (1925–1999) was a French actor. Michel was known for being the French voice of Sean Connery and Clint Eastwood in most of their films. He also dubbed Charlton Heston, Rock Hudson, Vittorio Gassman, Leslie Nielsen, Robert Mitchum and many others. In 1960, Heston sent Michel a letter praising his vocal performance in dubbing Heston for Ben-Hur.

Filmography

1925 births
1999 deaths
Male actors from Paris
French male voice actors
French male film actors
French male television actors
20th-century French male actors